Mirabilis linearis (common name narrowleaf four o'clock) is a plant. Among the Zuni people, the root is eaten to induce urination and vomiting. They also take an infusion of the root for stomachache.

References

linearis
Flora of the Southwestern United States
Plants used in traditional Native American medicine
Plants described in 1813